David of King's is a novel by Edward Frederic Benson. The first edition was published in 1924. It was published by London, New York [etc.] : Hodder and Stoughton.

David of King's (published in the USA as David Blaize of King's) is Benson's sequel  to his earlier novel David Blaize. The book deals with the story of David's Blaize's three years as an undergraduate at King's College, Cambridge.

References

External links
- David Blaize and other Benson first editions

1924 British novels
King's College, Cambridge
Hodder & Stoughton books
Novels set in Cambridge
Novels by E. F. Benson